Shelby is an unincorporated community and census-designated place in Cedar Creek Township, Lake County, Indiana. Shelby had a population of 453 at the 2020 census.

History
Shelby was laid out and platted in 1886 by William R. Shelby, when the railroad was extended to that point.

Geography
Shelby lies in the southeast corner of Cedar Creek Township, bordered to the south by the Kankakee River, which forms the Newton County line. Directly across the river is the unincorporated community of Thayer.

Indiana State Road 55 crosses the Kankakee River at Shelby, making one of the few Kanakee River crossings from Lake County. Shelby, along other small Kankakee River communities, has historically had to contend with periodic flooding from the Kankakee River.

Demographics

Economy
Whiteco Industries, an Indiana business which, with its affiliates, is engaged in advertising (particularly billboard advertising) in Indiana, and in ownership of hotels, grew along with Dean White from a small advertising business in Shelby. The successor to the Shelby location of Whiteco's business (in this location making graphics for commercial vehicles), Modagraphics, closed its doors, however, in 1993, as a result of a consolidation within its new parent company from Illinois.

Education
Students from Shelby attend schools operated by the Tri-Creek School Corporation in Lowell, Indiana.The school that was there was changed into a park.

The movie Now and Then is set in Shelby, Indiana, but the Shelby of the movie is fictional. The movie is actually based on the town of Winchester, Indiana.

Notable people
Jigger Sirois, IndyCar driver

References

Census-designated places in Lake County, Indiana
Census-designated places in Indiana
populated places established in 1886
1886 establishments in Indiana